James Morris Shaw (born October 18, 1945) is a Canadian former professional ice hockey goaltender. During the 1973–74 and 1974–75, Shaw played 37 games with the Toronto Toros of the World Hockey Association (WHA).

Awards and honors

References

External links

1945 births
Living people
Baltimore Clippers players
Canadian ice hockey goaltenders
Dallas Black Hawks players
Fort Wayne Komets players
Sportspeople from Saskatoon
Nova Scotia Voyageurs players
Saskatoon Blades players
Toronto Toros players
Ice hockey people from Saskatchewan